Anjudan (also Romanized as Anjedān; also known as Andījān, Anjidān, and Injadān) is a village in Amanabad Rural District, in the Central District of Arak County, Markazi Province, Iran. At the 2006 census, its population was 446, in 154 families. it situated near the major Shi'i centres of Qumm and Kashan in Iran, to which the Nizari Ismaili Imamate was transferred during the late 14th century CE. Owing to the village’s name, Nizari history between the 14th and 15th centuries is dubbed the “Anjudan period”.

History of the  Ismailis in Anjudan
The earliest evidence of an Ismaili presence in Anjudan is in the late 14th century at the time of Tamerlane’s attack on the community. Various Persian historians including Mirkhwand and Khwadamir record that Anjudan was prepared for attack, with a village fortress and intricate tunnels. These however did not prevent Tamerlane’s troops from prevailing. Despite the forays of Tamerlane in the region, Mirkhwand has pointed out in the late 15th century, that the village of Anjudan remained Ismaili.

Factors leading up to the transference of the Imamate
While the precise rationale for establishing the Imamate in Anjudan is unclear, there are various factors that likely contributed to this decision. Earlier efforts by the Ismailis to reestablish at Alamut were unsuccessful and the failure to fully obscure their religious convictions with the practice of taqiyya created a dangerous environment for the community in the South Caspian region. Anjudan’s distant location from the major centers of Sunni dominance, Tabriz and Herat also made it advantageous for the Imamate to be situated here.

Timur's Siege of Anjudan
In May 1393 Timur's army invaded the village of Anjudan. This crippled the Ismaili village only one year after his assault on the Ismailis in Mazandaran. The village was prepared for the attack. This is evidenced by it containing a fortress and a system of tunnels. Undeterred, Timur's soldiers flooded the tunnels by cutting into a channel overhead. Timur's reasons for attacking this village are not yet well understood. However, it has been suggested that his religious persuasions and view of himself as an executor of divine will may have contributed to his motivations. The Persian historian Khwandamir explains that an Ismaili presence was growing more politically powerful in Persian Iraq. A group of locals in the region was dissatisfied with this and, Khwandamir writes, these locals assembled and brought up their complaint with Timur, possibly provoking his attack on the Ismailis there.

The Imams at Anjudan
Al-Mustansir Billah II (1463/4–1480). The first known Ismaili Imam to have taken up residence in Anjudan was Mustansir bi’llah ‘Alishah, better known as Imam Mustansir bi'llah II and locally as Shah Qalandar. His mausoleum in Anjudan, known to the family of the Ismaili Imams, was first brought to the attention of Western scholarship by one of the pioneers of the study of the Ismailis, Wladimir Ivanow. Imam Mustansir bi’llah II was the first Nizari Ismaili Imam to settle and live in the village of Anjudan. This Imam (or his mausoleum) was also known as Shah Qalandar, which is a common Sufi epithet since the name “Qalandar” evokes the wandering spiritual guide who has no need for any spiritual guide himself.
Abd al-Salam Shah (1480–1493/4). The successor to Imam Mustansir bi’llah, Mahmud ibn Mustansir bi’llah, also known as Salaam Allah is recorded to have once commented that “contentment was more important than conquest”. It was for this reason that Mustansir bi’llah bestowed his son with the title ‘Abd al-Salam, meaning “servant of peace”.  His works include: Five Discourses   (Panj Sukhan), Decree of the Imam ‘Abd al-Salaam  (Farmān-i Shāh ‘Abd al-Salām, and  A Poem of Shah ‘Abd al-Salam b. Shah Mustansir bi’llah  Bandī az Shāh ‘Abd al-Salām [b.] Shāh Mustanṣir bi’llah.
Gharib Mirza (al-Mustansir Billah III) (1493/4–1498). Imam ‘Abbas Shah acquired the epithet “Gharib Mirza” due to his exile (ghurba) on account of political opposition. His works include: From the Discourses of Shah Gharib Mirza (Min Kalām-i Shāh Gharīb Mīrzā) on the mystical import of the alphabet and a poetic composition on similar topics. The Pandiyāt-i Jawānmardī, which was also authored anonymously under a certain Imam Mustansir bi’llah also likely contains the teachings of the Imam Gharib Mirza, who was also known as Imam Mustansir bi’llah III.  The mausoleum of this Imam is known locally as “Shah Gharib” and is still located in Anjudan today.

Financial support was regularly sent by Aga Khan I and Aga Khan II to the Anjudan people, in the late 19th century. In addition the Imams conducted restoration projects of various monuments and buildings of sentimental significance in the region.

Notable Figures
Among the major exponents of literature during the Anjudan revival was a poet known as Da'i Anjudani, likely a high-ranking member in the Ismaili hierarchy (hudūd), and brother Mawlana Malik Tayfur Anjudani.
The fortress of Nurabad near Anjudan is said to owe its name to a younger brother of Imam Gharib Mirza, Nur al-din.

See also 

Mahdi
Isma'ili
Sufism
Nāīmee
Nasīmee
Hurufiyya
Shi'a Islam
Nuktawiyya
Murād Mīrzā
Nuqta-yi Ula (Báb)
Mahmoud Pasikhani
List of Ismaili imams
List of extinct Shia sects

References

Populated places in Arak County
History of Nizari Isma'ilism
Anjudan